Top Model Curves is the second Scandinavian edition of Top Model. The series sees a number of plus-size aspiring models from Denmark, Norway and Sweden. They competed against each other in a variety of challenges to determine who will win title of the next "top model" of Scandinavia along a lucrative modelling contract, and other prizes in the hope of a successful future in the modeling industry. The series was presented by Danish singer and songwriter Lina Rafn, Norwegian fashion journalist and television personality Janka Polliani, and Swedish fashion stylist Jonas Hallberg.

Cycles

References

External links
 Official Swedish website

Scandinavia
Danish reality television series
Norwegian reality television series
Swedish reality television series
2016 Danish television seasons
2016 Norwegian television seasons
2016 Swedish television seasons
Non-American television series based on American television series
TV3 (Norway) original programming
TV3 (Denmark) original programming
TV3 (Sweden) original programming